Alzoniella pyrenaica is a species of minute freshwater snail with a gill and an operculum, an aquatic gastropod mollusk in the family Hydrobiidae. This species is endemic to France.

References 

Alzoniella
Hydrobiidae
Endemic molluscs of Metropolitan France
Gastropods described in 1983
Taxonomy articles created by Polbot